Nicolò D'Amico (born 20 October 1993) is an Italian rugby union player, currently playing for Top10 side Calvisano. He is also a permit player for the Pro14 side Zebre. His preferred position is prop.

Zebre
Under contract with Calvisano, D'Amico was announced as an additional player for Zebre in June 2021. He made his Zebre debut in Round 5 of the Pro14 Rainbow Cup competition against .

International Career
On 10 January 2023, he was named in Italy A squad for a uncapped test against Romania A.

References

External links
itsrugby.co.uk Profile

1993 births
Living people
Italian rugby union players
Zebre Parma players
Rugby union props